James Henry Duncan may refer to:
James H. Duncan (1793–1869), American politician
James Duncan (athlete) (1887–1955)